Fred Spaudling (born August 26, 1965) is an American sprint canoer who competed in the early 1990s. At the 1992 Summer Olympics in Barcelona, he was eliminated in the semifinals of both the C-1 500 m and the C-1 1000 m events.

References

1965 births
American male canoeists
Canoeists at the 1992 Summer Olympics
Living people
Olympic canoeists of the United States
Pan American Games medalists in canoeing
Pan American Games bronze medalists for the United States
Canoeists at the 1991 Pan American Games
Medalists at the 1991 Pan American Games